Hongcheon Pi clan was one of the Korean clans. Their Bon-gwan was in Hongcheon County, Gangwon Province, South Korea. According to the research in 2000, the number of Hongcheon Pi clan was 1143. He was a Jinwu Guard Commander in Yuan dynasty. He was dispatched as a special envoy during Chungnyeol of Goryeo’s reign in Goryeo.

See also 
 Korean clan names of foreign origin

References

External links 
 

 
Korean clan names of Chinese origin